High Garrett is road that is part of the A131, and hamlet, near the town of Braintree, in the Braintree district, in the English county of Essex. In 2018 the settlement had an estimated population of 814.

Location grid

References 

 Essex A-Z 2010

Hamlets in Essex
Braintree District